Uroš Lazić (born 15 March 2003) is a Serbian footballer who currently plays as a right-back for Radnik Surdulica, on loan from Red Star Belgrade.

Career statistics

Club

Notes

References

2003 births
Living people
Serbian footballers
Serbia youth international footballers
Association football defenders
Serbian First League players
Red Star Belgrade footballers
RFK Grafičar Beograd players
Serbia under-21 international footballers